The Broad River Bridge (also known as the Edward Burton Rogers Bridge) is a 1.7-mile-long (2.7 km) highway bridge that spans the Broad River in Beaufort County, South Carolina.  Originally built as a two-lane drawbridge, growth pressures and safety concerns demanded that a larger and taller fixed-span bridge be built.  The current four-lane wide structure was completed in 2004 and carries South Carolina Highway 170 as it connects northern and southern sections of Beaufort County.  Portions of the previous bridge were purchased by Beaufort County and are now used as a fishing dock.  In 2009, landscaping was added to the eastern approaches to the bridge.

See also
 South Carolina Highway 170
 Port Royal Sound

References

External links
Broad River Boat Landing and Fishing Pier (Beaufort County, South Carolina; Official Site)

Buildings and structures in Beaufort County, South Carolina
Bridges completed in 2004
Road bridges in South Carolina
Transportation in Beaufort County, South Carolina
Box girder bridges in the United States